The 1923 Temple Owls football team was an American football team that represented Temple University as an independent during the 1923 college football season. In its second and final season under head coach M. Francois D'Eliscu, the team compiled a 0–5 record.

Schedule

References

Temple
Temple Owls football seasons
College football winless seasons
Temple Owls football